Paul Pezos (born 11 February 1979) is an Australian footballer. He has played in the NSL with West Adelaide SC from 1996 until 1999 and then went to play in the South Australian Super League with Adelaide City. Paul was signed by A-League outfit Perth Glory on a short-term contract on the advice of former Perth Glory club legend Damian Mori because of his stand out performances for Adelaide City.

References

Living people
1979 births
Australian soccer players
Association football midfielders
West Adelaide SC players
Western Strikers SC players
Cumberland United FC players
North Eastern MetroStars SC players
West Torrens Birkalla SC players
Adelaide Blue Eagles players
Adelaide City FC players
Perth Glory FC players
Adelaide Olympic FC players
A-League Men players
FFSA Super League players
National Premier Leagues players
Australian people of Greek descent
Soccer players from Adelaide